Martha Emily "Pat" Kelly (née Bowler) (Mar Qtr 1873 – 26 April 1922) was an early female climber, and a founder of the Pinnacle Club.

Early life 
Kelly was the eldest child within a large family. She took up climbing in 1914, and is reported to have been "a graceful and bold balance climber".

By 1917 she was married to the climber, Harry Mills Kelly (1884-1980). They lived and shared an office together at 29 Fountain Street in Levenshulme, Manchester where he worked as an insurance clerk.

Climbing 
One of her best known achievements was to solo a rock climb known as Jones' route up Scafell pinnacle from Deep Ghyll in the Lake District. Those who watched her expressed their consternation at seeing a lone person ascending its rocky arete.

Kelly actively encouraged many women to climb. By 1920, her and her husband's office was being used as a base for her work, which culminated in a letter jointly written by Eleanor Winthrop Young being published in the Manchester Guardian in which she proposed the founding of a women-only club for rock climbers. Their letter garnered support from its editor, C E Montague, who, alongside his wife, were also climbers. This resulted in the founding of  the Pinnacle Club, the first rock-climbing club solely for women, at Pen-y-Gwryd in north Wales on 26 March 1921.  Kelly became the Pinnacle Club's first honorary secretary, and Winthrop Young its first president.

Death 
A year after forming the Pinnacle Club, Pat Kelly died as a result of injuries she sustained during a mysterious climbing accident on Tryfan on 17 April at the end of the 1922 Easter meet of the Pinnacle Club in North Wales. Right at the end of the day, she was found lying on her own, severely injured, at the base of apparently easy-to-climb rocks, albeit with one climbing boot missing. She was taken to Caernarvonshire and Anglesey Infirmary in Bangor, but died some days later on 26 April 1922 from fractures to the base of her skull.

Further reading
Shirley Angell, Pinnacle Club: a History of Women Climbing (1988)

References

English mountain climbers
Mountaineering deaths
1873 births
1922 deaths
Female climbers